Saints Alphius, Philadelphus and Cyrinus, martyrs in the Byzantine traditions of southern Italy,  were three brothers from Vaste, in the diocese of Otranto, who died with their mother, Benedicta, during the persecution of Decius, ca 251 AD. The details concerning these martyrdoms are traditional, drawn up at a later date in the Benedictine Acta of Saint Alphius.

According to the Acta, Alphius, Philadelphus, Cyrinus, ranging in age from nineteen to twenty-two, and their mother Benedicta were arrested with other Christians during the persecutions under Decius. They were taken to Pozzuoli, near Naples, where one of the Christians, Onesimus, was executed. The brothers were taken on to Sicily, where they were martyred at Lentini; there they are among the patron saints. Alphius had his tongue torn from his mouth. Philadelphus was burned on a stake and Cyrinus was boiled alive in oil.  No details of her execution are given for Benedicta. Their feast day is 10 May in Trecastagni, Sicily and Labor Day Weekend Lawrence, Massachusetts, USA.

References

Sources
 F. Halkin, 1987. Six inédits d'hagiologie Byzantine. ( Subsidia hagiographica)
 Catholic on-line: Saint Alphius
  Sant’Alfio santiebeati.it
  SS. Alfio - Filadelfo e Cirino: L'attesa è già festa

250s deaths
3rd-century Christian martyrs
Saints trios
Year of birth unknown